Al Arabi Volleyball is a professional Volleyball team based in Doha, Qatar. It competes in the Qatari Volleyball League. The team automatically qualified for the 2009, 2010, and 2011 edition of the FIVB Volleyball Men's Club World Championship as Qatar were the hosts. In 2012 Al Arabi team qualified for the FIVB Volleyball Men's Club World Championship as the Champion of AVC Club Volleyball Championship They have never advanced past the group stage in their appearances.

Honors

Domestic
 Qatar Volleyball League

 Winners (25): 1980, 1981, 1982, 1983, 1984, 1985, 1986, 1987, 1988, 1989, 1990, 1991, 1992, 1994, 1996, 1997, 2003, 2004, 2006, 2008, 2009, 2010, 2011, 2012, 2016,

 Emir Cup

 Winners (23): 1980, 1981, 1982, 1983, 1984, 1985, 1986, 1988, 1990, 1991, 1992, 1993, 1995, 1996, 1998, 2002, 2008, 2009, 2011, 2014, 2015, 2016, 2020

Crown Prince Cup

 Winners (16): 1991, 1992, 1994, 1996, 1997, 1998, 1999, 2000, 2001, 2006, 2008, 2009, 2012, 2014 , 2015, 2017 , 2019

Qatar Super Cup

 Winners (3): 2014, 2015,2016

QVA Cup

 Winners (2): 2014, 2016

Regional competitions
22 February Cup
 Winners (1): 1983

International

Asian Club Championship

 Winners (1): 2012
 Runners-up: 2010, 2015, 2016
 Third Place: 2007, 2009

 GCC Club Championship
 Winners (1): 2010
 Runners-up: 2007, 2012 , 2016
 Third Place:: 2009, 2013
 Fourth Place: 2011

 Arab Clubs Championship
 Winners (1): 2003
 Runners-up: 2002
 Fourth Place: 2006, 2008

Squad
Squad for 2011 FIVB Men's Club World Championship (As of October 8, 2011):

Head coach:  Mawya Alajnaf

Technical staff

Notable players
This list of former players includes those who received international caps while playing for the team, made significant contributions to the team in terms of appearances or goals while playing for the team, or who made significant contributions to the sport either before they played for the team, or after they left. It is clearly not yet complete and all inclusive, and additions and refinements will continue to be made over time.

Qatar
  Saed Al Hitmi
  Saeed Salem

Canada
  Frederic Winters

Croatia
  Igor Omrčen

Germany
  Christian Pampel

Poland
  Mariusz Wlazły (Loan)
  Łukasz Kadziewicz

Brasil
  Leandro Vissotto

Italy
  Ivan Zaytsev (Loan)
  Osmany Juantorena (Loan)
  Dante Boninfante
  Alexeis Argilagos
  Davide Saita
  Gianluca Saraceni

Serbia
  Ivan Miljković
  Uroš Kovačević (Loan)

Netherlands
  Tije Vlam

Czech Republic
  Jiří Popelka

Finland
  Matti Oivanen

United States
  Richard Lambourne

Cuba
  Salvador Hidalgo Oliva

Australia
  Nathan Roberts

India
  Raymond Williem

Managerial history
  Dragan Mihailović (2007–08)
  Mohamed Trabelsi (2009)
  Adel Sennoun (2010–?)
  Gheorghe Crețu (2013–14)
  Mawya Alajnaf (2015–)

Crest

References

External links
 Al Arabi Official Website - The team

Qatari volleyball clubs
Volleyball clubs established in 1952
1952 establishments in Qatar